Tynron is a village and civil parish in Dumfries and Galloway, south-west Scotland, lying in a hollow of the Shinnel Water,  from Moniaive.

At Tynron Doon  there can be seen the ditches and ramparts of a Roman Iron Age hillfort.

The name Tynron is probably from Cumbric din rhón meaning 'lance-fort'.

Notable people
James Shaw, Schoolmaster and Writer
Rev Prof James Williamson (1725-1795) mathematician, joint founder of the Royal Society of Edinburgh

References

External links
 Tynron Glen by John Shaw
 Tynron Parish

Villages in Dumfries and Galloway
Parishes in Dumfries and Galloway